The Chevy 500 was an IndyCar Series race held at Texas Motor Speedway near Fort Worth, Texas. The race was held on a Sunday afternoon in September. From 1998 until 2004. When it debuted in 1998, it was the first IndyCar race to have two races in Texas since 1979.

History
The first Championship/Indy car races in the Dallas/Fort Worth area took place at Arlington Downs Raceway in nearby Arlington, Texas. AAA sanctioned five races from 1947–1950. USAC sanctioned ten Championship car events at Texas World Speedway in College Station, Texas. The race was discontinued when the track closed in 1981.

Following the success of their spring race in 1997, Indycar added a second 500 km IndyCar Series race was held at the track in the fall of 1998. Known commonly as "Texas 2," the race was always held during the day compared to the summer race which was held at night. It served as the IndyCar Series' season finale for each of its races held here. The fall race was discontinued after 2004 when the Ferko lawsuit forced NASCAR to eliminate the Grand Slam and give the Texas Motor Speedway a deserved second Nextel Cup race.

In 2003, Gil de Ferran was leading on lap 187 when Kenny Bräck crashed on the backstretch. The massive accident seriously injured Bräck, and he raced only limitedly afterwards. With the race winding down under caution, and with cleanup still ongoing, officials stopped the race after 195 laps when it was clear they would not have time to go back to green. de Ferran was declared the winner in what was his final race in IndyCar (he had announced his retirement during the season).

Race length
IndyCar Series races were originally 208 laps (312 mi/500 km) long.

Summer race

Since 1997, IndyCar had a summer race. Unlike the fall race which was a day race, the race was held under the lights.

Champ Car race

The CART Champ Car series scheduled a race at the track for April 29, 2001. Following practice and qualifying, however, the race was cancelled "due to irresolvable concerns over the physical demands placed on the drivers at race speeds."

The Dayton Indy Lights race was completed with two cautions.

Past winners

USAC Championship car history (College Station)
See Texas World Speedway

IndyCar Series history (Fort Worth)

2001: Race postponed from September 16 to October 6 due to the September 11 attacks.
2003: Race shortened due to crash involving Kenny Bräck.

References

External links
IndyCar.com
Champ Car Stats
IndyCar Results Page

1998 establishments in Texas
Recurring sporting events established in 1998
Recurring sporting events disestablished in 2004
IndyCar Series races